"Say Something, Say Anything" is a single by the English alternative rock band, Blood Red Shoes, released on 7 April 2008. Upon release, the single reached #79 in the UK Singles Chart. During the intro riff/chorus there is a use of poly-meter, with the guitar playing in four bars of 3/4 and the drums playing in three bars of 4/4 respectively. The single artwork was designed by band-member Laura-Mary Carter.

Track listing

7" #1 
 "Say Something, Say Anything"
 "Waiting for Signs"

7" #2 
 "Say Something, Say Anything"
 "Say Something, Say Anything" (Demo)

CD 
 "Say Something, Say Anything"
 "Surf Song"
 "Try Harder" (Live)

Download 
 "Say Something, Say Anything"
 "Say Something, Say Anything" (Live)

References

2008 singles
2008 songs